Swayze is a surname found chiefly in the English speaking regions of  North America and representing an Anglicized form of the German-language surname Schweiz, Schweize, or Schweizer ("Swiss").

Notable persons having this surname include:

 Patrick Swayze, American actor and singer  
 Don Swayze, American actor and stuntman, younger brother of Patrick Swayze
 Isaac Swayze, American-Canadian soldier and politician
 John Cameron Swayze, American news commentator
 Marc Swayze, American comic book writer*

Other uses
 Swayze Field, in Oxford, Mississippi, US
 Swayze Lake, in St. Landry Parish, Louisiana, US
 Shwayze, a rapper

See also
 Swayzee, Indiana (sometimes spelled "Swayze"), a town in the United States